List of episodes from the series War Stories with Oliver North.

Episodes

2001

2002

2003

2004

2005

2006

2007

2008

2009

2010

2016

References
 War Stories with Oliver North Episode Guide - AOL Television

War Stories with Oliver North episodes